Dave Pensado is a Grammy Award-winning mix engineer. His career began in Atlanta in the 1970s and 1980s doing live and studio sound engineering. He has lived in Los Angeles since 1990.
He mixes between 200 and 250 songs a year at Larrabee Studios in Los Angeles. When recording he usually records at Echo Bar Studios in North Hollywood.

On September 12, 2011, mixing engineer Dave Pensado started a weekly show called Pensado's Place, together with Herb Trawick, his manager and business partner. The first part of the show (ITL = Into the lair) is about audio engineering techniques; Dave evaluates - sometimes assisted or even replace by a guest speaker - new plugins, outboard gear like microphones, and he demonstrates in detail how to improve different aspects of the mix. The second part Dave and Herb interview together a(n award winning) mixer, master engineer, producer, label CEO and/or singer-songwriter. Dave asks questions about the general approach and philosophy, and often zooms in on a selection of songs and/or albums his guest(s) worked on, discussing technical details. Herb merely focusses his questions and remarks on the business aspect of music. At the end of every show there is a Q&A: questions of the audience are asked and answered. All episodes are posted on the pensadoplace.tv website, but also on the YouTube channel Pensado's Place and are available for free.
.

On July 20, 2013, Dave Pensado and Herb Trawick hosted an event at Vintage King Los Angeles called "Pensado Gear Expo 2013". More than one thousand people from around the world attended. 22-time Grammy Award-winning engineer, Al Schmitt, Steven Slate, Alex da Kid, Ryan Hewitt, and Robert Duncan were a few of the featured guests of the expo.

Equipment 
Being a modern show, Pensado mixes primarily "in the box," which means he only occasionally uses and demonstrates  outboard analog gear, and instead processes/edits audio tracks in his computer ("the box") before sending finished mixes to a mastering engineer. He uses Pro Tools for the demonstrations and the show is sponsored by audio companies he respects.

Awards 
Pensado won a Grammy Award, alongside fellow engineers Jaycen Joshua and Kuk Harrell, for Mary J. Blige's 2008 Best Contemporary R&B Album, Growing Pains.

Pensado was the recipient of the 2020 NAMM TEC (Technical Excellence & Creativity) Hall of Fame Award. Pensado was officially inducted into the NAMM TEC Hall of Fame at the 35th Annual NAMM TEC Awards, held on January 18 in Anaheim, California.

Discography

Alumni 
Some successful audio engineers & producers that have assisted for Dave Pensado in the past include Sylvia Massy, Jaycen Joshua, Manny Marroquin, Dylan "3-D" Dresdow, Ariel Chobaz, Ethan Willoughby, Nico Hamui, and Rafael Fadul.

References

External links 
 Dave Pensado on Discogs
 Pensado's Place
Dave Pensado NAMM Oral History Program Interview (2015)

American audio engineers
Living people
People from Los Angeles
Engineers from California
Year of birth missing (living people)